KRI Hiu (634) is a FPB-57 Nav V patrol boat currently operated by the Indonesian Navy.

Service history 
Singa was built by Lürrsen-Werft, fitted out by PT PAL and launched in 2000. The ship was commissioned in 2000.

References

2000 ships
Patrol vessels of the Indonesian Navy
Naval ships of Indonesia